The Bank of Andalusia, at 28 S. Court Sq. in Andalusia, Alabama, was built in 1914.  It was listed on the National Register of Historic Places in 1989.

It is one-story brick building with a parapeted roof with a "pseudo-pediment", and is in an Early Classical Revival style.   It has a cut stone cornice with a frieze and dentils created by J. Thurron & Co. of New York City.  Its entryway has pairs of stone Tuscan pilasters supporting a carved stone molding.

It was expanded to the rear in 1924 by local craftsman, in more utilitarian style, but still with a parapeted roof and a cornice.  On the inside, the appearance is of just one building.

References

External links

Bank buildings on the National Register of Historic Places in Alabama
National Register of Historic Places in Covington County, Alabama
Neoclassical architecture in Alabama
Buildings and structures completed in 1914